Sam Bates (born 2 December 1995) is an English rugby league footballer who played as a prop for the Bradford Bulls and Dewsbury Rams.

Bradford

2014
Bates was named in the Bradford Bulls' team for the first time on 21 April 2014, for the match against Wigan Warriors. He made his professional début in this match, when he came on as a replacement for Jamal Fakir after 18 minutes, but was unable to prevent the Bradford Bulls from succumbing to an 84-6 defeat. He appeared again in the following match against Warrington Wolves. In June 2014, he signed a new two-year contract with Bradford Bulls.

2015
Bates did not feature in any of the pre-season friendlies.

Near the start of the season Bates was released from the club.

Statistics
Statistics do not include pre-season friendlies.

References

External links
Bradford Bulls profile

1995 births
Living people
Bradford Bulls players
Dewsbury Rams players
English rugby league players
Rugby league players from Halifax, West Yorkshire
Rugby league props